Witoon Mingmoon (born 10 February 1996) is a Thai Olympic weightlifter. He represented his country at the 2016 Summer Olympics.

References

1996 births
Living people
Witoon Mingmoon
Weightlifters at the 2016 Summer Olympics
Witoon Mingmoon
Witoon Mingmoon
Southeast Asian Games medalists in weightlifting
Competitors at the 2017 Southeast Asian Games
Witoon Mingmoon